The Slave is an 1899 novel by the British writer Robert Hichens.

Adaptation
In 1918, it was adapted into a silent film of the same title directed by Arrigo Bocchi and starring Hayford Hobbs and Charles Vane.

References

Bibliography
 Goble, Alan. The Complete Index to Literary Sources in Film. Walter de Gruyter, 1999.
 Vinson, James. Twentieth-Century Romance and Gothic Writers. Macmillan, 1982.

1899 British novels
Novels by Robert Hichens
British novels adapted into films